The 1945 National Invitation Tournament was the 1945 edition of the annual NCAA college basketball competition.

Selected teams
Below is a list of the eight teams selected for the tournament.

 Bowling Green
 DePaul
 Muhlenberg
 RPI
 Rhode Island
 St. John's
 Tennessee
 West Virginia

Bracket
Below is the tournament bracket.

See also
 1945 NCAA basketball tournament
 1945 NAIA Basketball Tournament

References

National Invitation
National Invitation Tournament
1940s in Manhattan
Basketball in New York City
College sports in New York City
Madison Square Garden
National Invitation Tournament
National Invitation Tournament
Sports competitions in New York City
Sports in Manhattan